Boswellia popoviana is a species of plant in the Burseraceae family. It is endemic to Yemen. Its natural habitats are subtropical or tropical dry forests and rocky areas.

References

popoviana
Endemic flora of Socotra
Threatened flora of Asia
Vulnerable plants
Taxonomy articles created by Polbot